All Things Are Possible is the solo debut album by Dan Peek after his departure from  the popular soft rock band America.  The album was released in 1979 and was a hit on contemporary Christian music radio stations. It was released by Pat Boone's label Lamb & Lion Records and was produced by Chris Christian, who also helped with the songwriting and contributed acoustic guitar and backing vocals on the album.

Peek parted ways with America in 1977 shortly after release of the Harbor album. Years of life on the road had taken a toll on him. He renewed his Christian faith and had begun to seek a different artistic direction than the other band members Gerry Beckley and Dewey Bunnell. With the release of All Things Are Possible, he became a pioneering artist in the emerging Christian pop music genre.

The title track, "All Things Are Possible" was the first single from the album and was a hit on both the CCM and the mainstream charts, reaching No. 6 on the AC Billboard chart and No. 1 in the Christian charts for 13 weeks; making it one of the earliest, if not the first, CCM crossover hits. The second single from the album, "Ready for Love" was a hit in Canada, making the top 10 in the Canadian Adult chart.  A third single, "Divine Lady" was released and made the CCM charts.  Peek’s America band mates, Beckley and Bunnell, provided backing vocals on another song on the album, "Love Was Just Another Word”.  This was the last time the three original members of America recorded together.

The album was nominated for a Grammy Award for Best Gospel Performance, Contemporary at the 22nd Grammy Awards, losing to The Imperials album Heed the Call.

Track listing 

 "All Things Are Possible" (Dan Peek, Chris Christian)
 "Divine Lady" (Dan & Catherine Peek)
 "Love Was Just Another World" (Chris Christian, Steve Kipner)
 "He's All That's Right" (Dan Peek)
 "One Way" (Chris Christian)
 "Ready for Love" (Chris Christian)
 "Lighthouse" (Tom Peek)
 "Forgive Me, Forgive You" (Dan & Catherine Peek)
 "Home Town" (Dan & Catherine Peek)
 "You're My Savior" (Dan Peek)
 "Have to Say Goodbye" (Dan Peek)

References 

1979 debut albums